Ayn al-Bayda is a town in northwestern Syria, administratively part of the Latakia Governorate, located north of Latakia. Nearby localities include Al-Shamiyah and Burj Islam to the west, al-Bahluliyah and Mashqita to the east and Mushayrafet al-Samouk to the southwest. According to the Syria Central Bureau of Statistics, Ayn al-Bayda had a population of 1,629 in the 2004 census. Its inhabitants are predominantly Alawites.

Climate
The climate is mild, and generally warm and temperate. There is more rainfall in the winter than in the summer. The climate is considered to be Csa according to the Köppen-Geiger climate classification. The average annual temperature is 18.5 °C. In a year, the average rainfall is 1004 mm.

References

Populated places in Latakia District
Towns in Syria
Alawite communities in Syria